Zhezhoulinyphia is a genus of east Asian sheet weavers. It was first described by M. Irfan, G. C. Zhou and X. J. Peng in 2019, and it has only been found in China.  it contains only three species: Z. caperata, Z. denticulata, and Z. yadongensis.

See also
 Centromerus
 List of Linyphiidae species (Q–Z)

References

Further reading

Linyphiidae genera
Spiders of China